Tripoli Creek is a creek in the Unorganized North Part of Algoma District in northeastern Ontario, Canada. It is part of the Lake Superior drainage basin.

It heads northeast under the Canadian Pacific Railway transcontinental mainline between the settlements of Amyot to the west and Girdwood,  to the east, to reach Tripoli Lake.

Tributaries
Ryerson Creek (right)

See also
List of rivers of Ontario

References

Rivers of Algoma District